Mitchell's rainforest snail (Thersites mitchellae) is a species of large, air-breathing land snail, a terrestrial pulmonate gastropod mollusc in the family Camaenidae.

This species is native to Australia. It is an endangered species.

Description
The shell of this species measures up to 5.5 cm across and is reddish brown to black with two distinct yellow bands. The visible soft parts of the animal are black.

Ecology
While it prefers and enjoys palm and fig trees, the Mitchell's rainforest snail is usually traveling along the forest floor among fallen leaves or under the bark on many trees.  This nocturnal animal feeds upon leaf litter, fungi and lichen, making these substances its primary diet.  Despite the fact the Mitchell's rainforest snail is nocturnal, it can be spotted year-round and has no specific season in which it may disappear or hibernate

Distribution and threats
The snail used to be commonly found in rainforests and swampy parts of northern coastal lowlands and prefers palms and fig trees within rainforests.  It also used to be found throughout coastal floodplain wetlands, coastal swamp forests, eastern riverine forests, littoral rainforests, northern warm temperate rainforests, and subtropical rainforests. The species is also found on the rainforests surrounding the Amazon river.

Unfortunately, Thersites mitchellae is on the endangered species list due to numerous threats.  These threats include, but are not limited to animals that have been introduced to the snail’s small habitat such as rats and birds.  Other major threats consist of the use of herbicides and pesticides, fires, weed invasion, and is also largely tied to deforestation.  This critically endangered snail is now largely restricted to a range of less than 5 km² of remnant lowland rainforest, scattered around the Tweed, Byron and Ballina Shires of northern New South Wales. A significant population can still be found on the Stotts Island Nature Reserve on the Tweed River. Scientists believe that less than 500 mature individuals remain in the wild.

References

 Threatened Species Profile for Mitchell's Rainforest Snail
 Rainforest Snail - Northern Rivers: Distribution and vegetation associations in the Northern Rivers
 The IUNC Red List of Threatened Species - Thersites mitchellae
 Thersites mitchellae  — Mitchell's Rainforest Snail
 NSW Scientific Committee - final determination
 Mitchell's Rainforest Snail - Priority actions

External links
 Mitchell's Rainforest Snail Teaching Resources for Primary Schools (by the Foundation for National Parks & Wildlife)

Camaenidae